Bhram is a psychological horror/thriller wherein the protagonist suffers from PTSD and traverses all kinds of extremes (paranormal, mythical, psychological) in order to unearth a long-forgotten truth. The twisted forgotten past reveals new truths and changes everything. The web series streams on Zee5 in India.

Cast
 Kalki Koechlin as Alisha Khanna
 Bhumika Chawla as Ankita Paul
 Sanjay Suri as Peter Paul
 Eijaz Khan as Pradeep Choudhary
 Chandan Roy Sanyal as Insp. Rawat
 Satyadeep Misra as Fr. Alfred Joseph
 Sangeeta Ghosh as Durga
 Aashit Chaterji as Abdul
 Vikram Kochar as Avtar
 Ahtesham Hussain as Constable Shamsher
 Garima Kaushal as Kritika Paul
 Omkar Kapoor as Yash Khanna
 Anjali Tatrari as Ayesha Sayyed
 Tushar Bakshi as Alfie
 Mir Sarwar as Elder Yakub                                                                                                                                                                                                                                                                                                     
 Ansh Sinha as Younger Yakub
 Utsav Sarkar as Paglu
 Dharampreet Gill as Immanuel
Chetan Sharma as PP
Vikram Dwivedi as PC
Harsh Vashisht as Dr Saini
Jashn Agnihotri as Mrs. Saini
Rajendranath Zutshi as Dr Rao
Hari Kumar K. as Journalist

Episodes

References

External links

Bhram on ZEE5

Horror fiction web series
Indian drama web series
2019 web series debuts